Dougal McRee Buie (June 27, 1888 – March 30, 1938) was a college football and baseball player and coach as well as an attorney. Buie attended both Davidson College and the University of North Carolina at Chapel Hill before attending the University of Florida.

References

1888 births
1938 deaths
Florida Gators baseball coaches
20th-century American lawyers
Baseball players from North Carolina
Sportspeople from Gainesville, Florida
People from Red Springs, North Carolina
Davidson Wildcats football players
Davidson Wildcats baseball players
Florida Gators baseball players
Players of American football from Gainesville, Florida
Baseball players from Gainesville, Florida